Campbell is a town in the middle of the Mississippi River in La Crosse County, Wisconsin, United States. It is part of the La Crosse, Wisconsin Metropolitan Statistical Area. The population was 4,358 as of the 2010 Census.

All of the town's population resides in its eastern portion, on the section of French Island denoted French Island CDP by the United States Census Bureau. Some of the island is part of the city of La Crosse. The Town of Campbell borders the city of La Crosse.

Two origins of Campbell's name
The town was originally created in 1851, and was officially named after Erasmus D. Campbell, a former Lieutenant Governor of Wisconsin. Today, the Town of Campbell is confined to part of a large island bordered by the Mississippi and Black rivers and Lake Onalaska. This island has been traditionally known as "French Island."  Joseph French, one of the earliest settlers of the town arrived in May 1851. French's family originated from Leicestershire, England. Later, French-Canadian settlers, primarily farmers from the Canadian Province of Quebec, settled on the island-part of Campbell, then a much larger town between the incorporated settlements of Onalaska and La Crosse.

Geography
According to the United States Census Bureau, the town has a total area of 12.57 square miles (32.556 km2).Of this, 3.84 square miles (9.95 km2) is land and 8.73 square miles (22.6 km2) of it (69.44%) is water.

Demographics

As of the census of 2000, there were 4,410 people, 1,754 households, and 1,266 families residing in the town. The population density was 1,148.0 people per square mile (443.4/km2). There were 1,823 housing units at an average density of 474.5 p|er square mile (183.3/km2). The racial makeup of the town was 96.49% White, 0.52% African American, 0.52% Native American, 1.09% Asian, 0.02% Pacific Islander, 0.27% from other races, and 1.09% from two or more races. Hispanic or Latino of any race were 0.68% of the population.

There were 1,754 households, out of which 31.4% had children under the age of 18 living with them, 60.7% were married couples living together, 7.8% had a female householder with no husband present, and 27.8% were non-families. 21.6% of all households were made up of individuals, and 6.6% had someone living alone who was 65 years of age or older. The average household size was 2.51 and the average family size was 2.93.

In the town, the population was spread out, with 23.8% under the age of 18, 8.4% from 18 to 24, 27.3% from 25 to 44, 28.9% from 45 to 64, and 11.6% who were 65 years of age or older. The median age was 40 years. For every 100 females, there were 101.1 males. For every 100 females age 18 and over, there were 100.2 males.

The median income for a household in the town was $44,736, and the median income for a family was $55,439. Males had a median income of $37,165 versus $25,267 for females. The per capita income for the town was $20,741. About 4.6% of families and 5.1% of the population were below the poverty line, including 8.0% of those under age 18 and 1.5% of those age 65 or over.

Economy
The French Island Generating Plant is located in the town.

Transportation
The La Crosse Regional Airport occupies the northern part of French Island.

Notable people
Dan Kapanke, businessman and politician
Ron Kind, lawyer and politician

Notes

References
Campbell town, La Crosse County, Wisconsin United States Census Bureau

Towns in La Crosse County, Wisconsin
Towns in Wisconsin